Aleksei Ivanovich Musin-Pushkin (Russian:Алексей Иванович Мусин-Пушкин; 27 March 1744, Moscow - 13 February 1817, Moscow) was a Russian statesman and historian, known for his large art and book collections.

Biography 
He was born to Ivan Yakovlevich Musin-Pushkin (1710–1799), a Guard Captain, and his wife, Natalia Mikhailovna, née Priklonskaya. He graduated from the artillery school in Saint Petersburg, then served as the  Adjutant to General Grigory Orlov. In 1772, when the General was discharged, at his own request, for health reasons, Musin-Pushkin went on an extended tour of Europe; visiting Germany, France, the Netherlands, Italy, Switzerland, and England. When he returned in 1775, he was appointed a Master of Ceremonies at the Imperial Court. In 1781, he married  Ekaterina Wolkonskaya (1754-1829), daughter of Major-General . They had three sons and five daughters.

In 1785, he became an honorary member of the Imperial Academy of Arts; elevated to full member in 1789. Later, he was able to acquire the Laurentian Codex. 

That same year, Empress Catherine the Great named him Procuror (representative) for the Holy Synod; charging him with the collection of important documents and manuscripts from churches and monasteries throughout Russia. Local administrators were notified, and he received over 100 items the first year. In 1793, he became a Privy Councilor. Numerous other collections from nobles and scholars were added over the years. 

In 1795, following the death of Ivan Betskoy, he succeeded to the position of President of the Imperial Academy. During his tenure, he oversaw the construction of a new building, designed by Alexander Kokorinov and Jean-Baptiste Vallin de la Mothe. He also reorganized the class structure, and sought new sponsors. His professorial appointments were predominantly Russian, rather than German. A notable exception was Ignaz Sebastian Klauber, from Augsburg, who was brought in to head the engraving department. To help with finances, he proposed that students should pay half of the proceeds from the sale of their works to the Academy's treasury, but this was met with too much resistance. Later, he initiated annual exhibitions, with cash prizes from his own salary. In 1796, he was awarded the Order of Saint Alexander Nevsky.

The following year, having been made a Count and Senator, he resigned; settling in Moscow with his book and art collections. This was never done. As a result, they were destroyed in 1812, during the Great Moscow Fire. Only a few pieces which had been lent or given to other people survived, including the Laurentian Codex, which had been presented to Emperor Alexander I. He attempted to restore the collection, but acquired very little before his death in 1817, aged seventy-two.

References

External links 

The House of Count Aleksei Musin-Pushkin (1744-1818) in St. Petersburg @ Moyka 104 

1744 births
1817 deaths
18th-century historians from the Russian Empire
Members of the Russian Academy
Russian nobility
The Tale of Igor's Campaign
Most Holy Synod